Conrad Lawrence Eklund (February 19, 1894 – March 18, 1953) was an American football player and coach.  He served as the head football coach at Augsburg Seminary—now known as Augsburg University—from 1926 to 1932, compiling a record of 15–22–5.

References

1894 births
1953 deaths
American football guards
American football tackles
Augsburg Auggies football coaches
Great Lakes Navy Bluejackets football players
Macalester Scots football players
Minnesota Golden Gophers football players